John Patteson may refer to:
 John Patteson (bishop) (1827–1871), Anglican bishop and martyr
 John Patteson (1755–1833), English Tory politician, Member of Parliament (MP) for Minehead 1802–1806, and for Norwich 1806–1812
 John Patteson (judge) (1790–1861), English judge

See also
John Pattison (disambiguation)